Goniorrhachis is a genus of flowering plants in the legume family, Fabaceae. It belongs to the subfamily Detarioideae. It contains a single species, Goniorrhachis marginata, native to eastern Brazil.

Detarioideae
Monotypic Fabaceae genera
Endemic flora of Brazil